Mazlan bin Ismail was the Chief Operating Officer for Malaysian Communications and Multimedia Commission (MCMC). He retired from Vice President, Telekom Malaysia (TM) and took part in Malaysian politics and first appointed by the Ministry of Communications and Multimedia Malaysia to be an advisor to MCMC with specialised duties, before appointed to his current post. He is known best to run in the 13th general election in Malaysia in Permatang Pauh, a parliament in the state of Penang. In the 2013 general election, he lost to PKR leader Anwar Ibrahim with a majority of 11,721 votes. Although defeated, he received an increase of nearly 10,000 votes (64%) to his party from the previous election held in 2008. Now, with his long experience in the telecommunications industry, especially during the tenure as Vice President National Network Operations (VPNNO) of TM, his current main task is to provide advice and guidance to the Malaysians Communications and Multimedia Commission in the planning and implementation of the government's Digital Nation Development, with the target in the suburbs, a key objective in achieving Vision 2020.

Background
Mazlan Ismail was born in Kubang Ulu, Penanti, Bukit Mertajam (within the parliamentary constituent he contested) to Puan binti Hamid and Allahyarham Ismail bin Daud (better known as Pak Mail bas). Born in a poor family of whom both parents worked as rubber-tapers, while the father also drives school buses too in the morning, he was set to change the family's fate. He is known to the locals as Abang Lan Telekom, due to his occupation as a government servant while working in Jabatan Telekom (later privatised into Telekom Malaysia). 
Upon completion of his primary school locally, he continued his study in a boarding school, Sekolah Menengah Kebangsaan Sultan Abdul Halim in Jitra, Kedah (back then known as JENAN and now as SMSAH). Later, Mazlan went to University Technology Malaysia (UTM) in 1978 -1981 to study Diploma in Electronic Communications and furthered his first degree in University of Salford, United Kingdom in 1981 -1983.
Mazlan then worked with Telekom Malaysia before being sponsored to further his study in master's degree in 1996, again in the United Kingdom in the University of Coventry specialising in Operational Telecommunication. In 2005 he received his doctorate degree (PhD) from the Business and Advance Technology Centre of University Technology Malaysia Kuala Lumpur.
Further training includes training in Strategic Planning and Implementation of Telecommunication in Bell South Telecom, Florida, United States (1990), Training Innovation & Leadership in Motorola University, Schaumrbeg, United States (1995), Leadership Training in Madinah Institute of Leadership and Entrepreneurship, Madinah, Saudi Arabia (2012) and others.

Tenure in Telekom Malaysia
Mazlan worked for 30 years as an engineer in Telekom Malaysia, holding various posts, from Assistant Manager in Butterworth, Penang to General Manager for Northern Region of Malaysia, and settled into senior management post as Vice President of National Network Operation (VP NNO), in-charge for technical network operation (transmission, data, switching & access networks) throughout Malaysia. The job scope was to be in-charge of around 320 executives, 7000 TM members and 5000 TM contractor members. He was also being appointed as a senior management TM's Group Leadership Team members chaired by TM's CEO.
 
Mazlan was appointed as Commanding Officer, ranked Lt Colonel of Rejimen Semboyan Pakar Diraja Telekom. Pakar Semboyan or Askar Wataniah Pakar Telekom with 700 Telekom Malaysia's staff reserves is responsible for the telecommunication service operation during times such as in DARURAT or declaration of emergency in Malaysia.

Other consultation experiences 
Advisory panel to Competency Development, Human Resource Department, Human Resource Ministry - Mac 2010 – Mac 2012
Electric, Electronics, Communication & Broadcasting sector specialist in, Communication and Information Department, Human Resource Ministry - Mac 2010 – Mac 2012
Fellow Adjunct Lecturer, Faculty of Technology Management, Universiti Utara Malaysia – January 2006 to December 2009
Co-writer of Malaysia Prime Minister's book for the nation entitled "1 Malaysia Menjana Negara Sejahtera n Bahagia" - published in 2010
Chairman and Founder of Darul Wehdah Permatang Pauh, a non-governmental organization that promotes Islamic learning and knowledge culture in Penang.

Disabled community’s voice in manifesto campaign 
One of the most notable issues raised and became a manifesto of Mazlan during the general election was the pledge to assist the needy particularly the disabled community in Malaysia.
Inspired by his own eldest son who's an OKU (Orang Kelainan Upaya) with blind disability from birth, Mazlan is set to bring up the disabled community's voice into parliament if he was elected into it. Notable appearance of his son was when he prayed in public for his father's victory in the election (video). Mazlan was quoted saying that having had a personal experience in raising a disabled child, he empathise and understand more of the feeling and challenges faced by parents with similar situations. He promised to adopt three existing rehabilitative centres in the constituency, namely in Kampung Pertama, Seberang Jaya and Kampung Tanah Liat.

Social contribution 

In the aftermath of the Malaysia's 13th General Election where Mazlan lost to the incumbent Anwar Ibrahim, he took the chance of his reputation by establishing a religious study centre for the local community. With the objective to unite the people regardless of political ideology, and where everyone can come and study Al-Quran or hear religious sermons, Pusat Pengajian Darul Wehdah was set up in Simpang Tiga Kubang Ulu, aiming to hold programmes focusing on education, motivation, development issues and women. He criticized religious-schools that were used to incite hatred towards political enemies and these are detrimental to the people's unity.
The study centre has since organized various programmes especially the weekly sermons, Islamic event talks and others. Videos of the programmes held can be watched in Darul Wehdah’s youtube channel and Facebook page.

Election results 
{| class="wikitable" style="margin:0.5em ; font-size:95%"
|+ Parliament of Malaysia
!Year!Constituency! colspan="2" |Candidate!Votes!Pct! colspan="2" |Opponent(s)!Votes
!Pct
|-
| rowspan="2" |2013
| rowspan="2" |P44 Permatang Pauh, Penang| rowspan="2"  |
| rowspan="2" |Mazlan bin Ismail (BN-UMNO)
| rowspan="2" |25,369
| rowspan="2" |40.06%
| |
|Anwar Ibrahim (PR-PKR)|37,090
|58.56%
|-
| |
|Abdullah Zawawi Samsudin (Ind)
|201
|0.32%
|}

Honours
 :
 Knight Commander of the Order of Loyalty to the Crown of Kelantan (D.P.S.K.) – Dato' (2017)
 :
 Knight Commander of the Order of the Territorial Crown (P.M.W.) – Datuk''' (2018)

References 

Alumni of Coventry University
Alumni of the University of Salford
Living people
Malaysian businesspeople
Malaysian politicians
People from Penang
Year of birth missing (living people)